James Scott Eakins (born May 24, 1946) is a retired American professional basketball player and two-time American Basketball Association champion.

A 6'11" center from Brigham Young University, Eakins was selected in the fifth round of the 1968 NBA draft by the San Francisco Warriors and in the 1968 ABA Draft by the Oakland Oaks.

Known as "Jimbo", Eakins played eight seasons (1968–1976) in the ABA as a member of the Oakland Oaks, Washington Caps, Virginia Squires, Utah Stars, and New York Nets.  He won ABA championships in 1969 with the Oakland Oaks and in 1976 with the New York Nets.  Eakins also represented Virginia in the 1974 ABA All-Star Game.

After the ABA–NBA merger in 1976, Eakins played in the NBA until 1978 as a member of the Kansas City Kings, San Antonio Spurs, and Milwaukee Bucks.  In his ABA/NBA career, he scored 8,255 points and grabbed 5,578 rebounds.

Career statistics

ABA

Regular season

|-
| align="left" | 1968–69
| align="left" | Oakland
| 78 || - || 21.4 || .543 || .000 || .719 || 7.2 || 0.7 || - || - || 13.0
|-
| align="left" | 1969–70
| align="left" | Washington
| 82 || - || 14.8 || .497 || .000 || .741 || 5.0 || 0.9 || - || - || 6.4
|-
| align="left" | 1970–71
| align="left" | Virginia
| 84 || - || 26.6 || .515 || .000 || .759 || 9.3 || 1.9 || - || - || 10.8
|-
| align="left" | 1971–72
| align="left" | Virginia
| 84 || - || 32.4 || .486 || .000 || .764 || 9.6 || 2.2 || - || - || 12.3
|-
| align="left" | 1972–73
| align="left" | Virginia
| 83 || - || 30.8 || .522 || .000 || .802 || 8.8 || 3.2 || - || 1.6 || 15.0
|-
| align="left" | 1973–74
| align="left" | Virginia
| 84 || - || 31.5 || .520 || .000 || .785 || 9.6 || 2.8 || 0.8 || 1.2 || 14.6
|-
| align="left" | 1974–75
| align="left" | Utah
| 84 || - || 30.5 || .503 || .000 || .836 || 7.2 || 1.7 || 0.7 || 1.0 || 12.5
|-
| align="left" | 1975–76
| align="left" | Utah
| 16 || - || 35.5 || .439 || .000 || .915 || 9.4 || 2.1 || 0.6 || 0.6 || 12.7
|-
| align="left" | 1975–76
| align="left" | Virginia
| 23 || - || 27.7 || .418 || .000 || .904 || 7.3 || 1.6 || 0.8 || 1.8 || 9.3
|-
| align="left" | 1975–76
| align="left" | New York
| 34 || - || 13.6 || .503 || .000 || .848 || 3.5 || 0.5 || 0.2 || 0.6 || 6.2
|- class="sortbottom"
| style="text-align:center;" colspan="2"| Career
| 652 || - || 26.5 || .507 || .000 || .783 || 7.9 || 1.8 || 0.6 || 1.2 || 11.7
|}

Playoffs

|-
| align="left" | 1968–69
| align="left" | Oakland
| 16 || - || 20.6 || .537 || .000 || .711 || 6.4 || 0.9 || - || - || 11.8
|-
| align="left" | 1969–70
| align="left" | Washington
| 7 || - || 9.3 || .583 || .000 || 1.000 || 2.0 || 0.7 || - || - || 4.4
|-
| align="left" | 1970–71
| align="left" | Virginia
| 12 || - || 24.7 || .505 || .000 || .750 || 10.0 || 1.7 || - || - || 10.3
|-
| align="left" | 1971–72
| align="left" | Virginia
| 11 || - || 29.5 || .475 || .000 || .692 || 8.7 || 2.0 || - || - || 9.4
|-
| align="left" | 1972–73
| align="left" | Virginia
| 5 || - || 43.4 || .593 || .000 || .824 || 11.4 || 3.6 || - || - || 24.8
|-
| align="left" | 1973–74
| align="left" | Virginia
| 5 || - || 38.0 || .521 || .000 || .788 || 10.8 || 3.8 || 1.4 || 0.8 || 20.0
|-
| align="left" | 1974–75
| align="left" | Utah
| 6 || - || 32.3 || .636 || .000 || .917 || 6.2 || 1.2 || 1.5 || 1.8 || 13.5
|-
| align="left" | 1975–76
| align="left" | New York
| 13 || - || 21.6 || .536 || .000 || .806 || 6.0 || 0.8 || 0.5 || 0.5 || 6.8
|- class="sortbottom"
| style="text-align:center;" colspan="2"| Career
| 75 || - || 25.3 || .540 || .000 || .761 || 7.4 || 1.6 || 0.9 || 0.9 || 11.2
|}

NBA

Regular season

|-
| align="left" | 1976–77
| align="left" | Kansas City
| 82 || - || 16.3 || .449 || - || .847 || 4.4 || 1.5 || 0.4 || 0.6 || 6.0
|-
| align="left" | 1977–78
| align="left" | San Antonio
| 16 || - || 15.7 || .577 || - || .853 || 2.9 || 1.1 || 0.2 || 0.6 || 5.6
|-
| align="left" | 1977–78
| align="left" | Milwaukee
| 17 || - || 9.1 || .412 || - || .808 || 1.7 || 0.7 || 0.2 || 0.4 || 2.9
|- class="sortbottom"
| style="text-align:center;" colspan="2"| Career
| 115 || - || 15.2 || .462 || - || .844 || 3.8 || 1.3 || 0.3 || 0.6 || 5.5
|}

Playoffs

|-
| align="left" | 1977–78
| align="left" | Milwaukee
| 3 || - || 6.0 || .200 || - || .000 || 0.3 || 0.3 || 0.3 || 0.0 || 0.7
|- class="sortbottom"
| style="text-align:center;" colspan="2"| Career
| 3 || - || 6.0 || .200 || - || .000 || 0.3 || 0.3 || 0.3 || 0.0 || 0.7
|}

External links
Career statistics
Recent photo of Jim Eakins @ nbrpa.com

1946 births
Living people
American men's basketball players
Basketball players from Sacramento, California
BYU Cougars men's basketball players
Centers (basketball)
Kansas City Kings players
Milwaukee Bucks players
New York Nets players
Oakland Oaks draft picks
Oakland Oaks players
San Antonio Spurs players
San Francisco Warriors draft picks
Utah Stars players
Virginia Squires players
Washington Caps players